Wilkerson Pass, elevation , is a mountain pass in the Rocky Mountains within Pike National Forest of Colorado and marks the eastern boundary of South Park (Park County, Colorado).

The pass is traversed by U.S. Highway 24 with a Forest Service visitor center at the summit along with a few short trails. The summit has a mild approach on both sides and does not cause problems for vehicles in winter, generally.

See also
Colorado mountain passes

References

Mountain passes of Colorado
Landforms of Park County, Colorado
U.S. Route 24
Transportation in Park County, Colorado